Lady's Bridge is the oldest bridge across the River Don in the City of Sheffield, England. It is located in the central section of the city, linking the Wicker to the north with Waingate to the south.

History

The first bridge
The original wooden bridge at this point was constructed close to Sheffield Castle sometime after 1150 under the orders of William de Lovetot, the Norman baron who had also built the castle along with the town's first church, hospital (at Spital Hill), and corn mill (at Millsands).

Lady's Bridge
In 1485 the Vicar of Sheffield, Sir John Plesaunce, and William Hill, who was a master mason, both agreed to build a bridge of stone "over the watyr of Dune neghe the castell of Sheffeld" at a cost of about £67. A small chapel, dedicated to the Virgin Mary, was built close to the bridge, and the bridge became known as 'Our Lady's Bridge'. When built it could only be crossed by pedestrians as there were steps at either end of the bridge. The chapel was converted for use as a wool warehouse in 1547, to prevent its demolition as part of the Dissolution of the Monasteries during the reign of Henry VIII, and was subsequently used as an Alms house.

Modifications

In 1760 the bridge was widened on the upstream side, and the Alms House (formerly the chapel to Our Lady) was demolished to make way for the new structure. The bridge was widened on the downstream side in 1864, virtually obscuring the remaining original structure from view, and again in 1909, to allow trams to cross the bridge. It was restored in the late 20th century, and has been a Grade II listed structure since 1973.

The Great Sheffield Flood
On the night of 11 March 1864 Lady's Bridge narrowly avoided destruction when the waters of the Great Sheffield Flood poured over it. Nearly every other bridge upstream in the path of the flood had been smashed by the waters and the debris that they carried. A contemporary account described the scene:

2007 flooding
During the 2007 United Kingdom floods, Sheffield was badly hit, and Lady's Bridge and the Wicker in particular.  Lady's Bridge was overwhelmed with water as it, the Wicker and the Blonk Street Bridge were flooded, and Lady's Bridge itself was at one point reported to be in danger of collapse.

See also
List of bridges in the United Kingdom

Bibliography

 (wikisource)

References

Bridges completed in 1485
Bridges completed in the 12th century
Bridges in Sheffield
Bridges over the River Don, South Yorkshire
Grade II listed buildings in Sheffield
Grade II listed bridges